Doxander is a genus of sea snails, marine gastropod mollusks in the family Strombidae, the true conchs.

The name Doxander was originally given by Iredale to this genus in 1931. But since he did not provide a description, the name Doxander, Iredale, 1931 is no longer available under Art. 13.1 of the ICZN Code.

Species
Species within the genus Doxander include:
Doxander campbelli (Griffith & Pidgeon, 1834)
 Doxander entropi (Man in 't Veld & Visser, 1993)
Doxander japonicus (Reeve, 1851)
 Doxander operosus (Röding, 1798)
Doxander vittatus (Linnaeus, 1758)
Species brought into synonymy
Doxander apicatus (Man in't Veld, L.A. & G.J. Visser, 1993): synonym of Doxander operosus (Röding, 1798)

References

 Wenz, W. (1938-1944). Gastropoda. Teil 1: Allgemeiner Teil und Prosobranchia. xii + 1639 pp. In: Schindewolf, O.H. (Ed.) Handbuch der Paläozoologie, Band 6. Bornträger, Berlin.
 Liverani V. (2014) The superfamily Stromboidea. Addenda and corrigenda. In: G.T. Poppe, K. Groh & C. Renker (eds), A conchological iconography. pp. 1-54, pls 131-164. Harxheim: Conchbooks
 Dekkers A.M. & Maxwell S.J. (2020). An examination of the relationships between extant Dolomena Wenz, 1940, Doxander Wenz, 1940, Mirabilistrombus Kronenberg, 1998, Neodilatilabrum Dekkers, 2008 and Labiostrombus Oostingh, 1925 (Stromboidea: Neostromboidae: Strombidae). The Festivus. 52(1): 39-59

External links
 Iredale, T. (1931). Australian molluscan notes. Nº I. Records of the Australian Museum. 18: 201-235

Strombidae